"Into the Heart" is the second studio single by British synthpop band Mirrors. The single was released in the UK on 2 November 2009 as a 7" vinyl single and as a digital download on the Moshi Moshi Records label.

"Lights and Offerings" was re-recorded during the Lights and Offerings album sessions in June 2010, but never mixed or finished for inclusion on the album. The Moshi Moshi version was however included on the Broken by Silence Tour EP.

Track listing

Re-release

The song was re-released on 14 February 2011 on the Skint Records label to promote the "Lights and Offerings" album. This re-issue contained the re-recorded version, a new B-side and a new remix.

A 12" single will be released in Greece at the end of May on the Undo Records label which will be limited to 500 copies. It is currently unknown which tracks are going to be featured on the disc.

Note that the 7" contains a stand-alone version of "Into the Heart" with a full heartbeat outro whereas the digital release contains the album version excluding the interlude of 21 seconds which is simply cut off at the end of the song.

Track listing

Personnel
 James New
 Ally Young
 James Arguile
 Josef Page

References

External links
 Official Website
 Skint Records
 Official German Portal

2009 singles
2011 singles
2009 songs